The Cameronians (Scottish Rifles) was a rifle regiment of the British Army, the only regiment of rifles amongst the Scottish regiments of infantry. It was formed in 1881 under the Childers Reforms by the amalgamation of the 26th Cameronian Regiment and the 90th Perthshire Light Infantry. In 1968, when reductions were required, the regiment chose to be disbanded rather than amalgamated with another regiment, one of only two infantry regiments in the British Army to do so, with the other being the York and Lancaster Regiment. It can trace its roots to that of the Cameronians, later the 26th of Foot, who were raised in 1689. The 1881 amalgamation coincided with the Cameronian's selection to become the new Scottish Rifles.

History

Formation
The Cameronians (Scottish Rifles) was formed in 1881 under the Childers Reforms by the amalgamation of the 26th Cameronian Regiment and the 90th Perthshire Light Infantry. After the amalgamation, the 1st Battalion preferred to be known as "The Cameronians" while the 2nd preferred to be known as "The Scottish Rifles". The 2nd Battalion saw action at the Battle of Spion Kop in January 1900 during the Second Boer War.

Two Militia battalions were formed from the former 2nd Royal Lanark Militia. The 3rd battalion was embodied in May 1900 for service during the Second Boer War. More than 600 men embarked for South Africa in April 1901, and returned in June 1902, following the end of hostilities. The 4th battalion had been embodied already in December 1899, also for service in the same war, and 600 officers and men embarked for South Africa in late February 1900.

In 1908, the Volunteers and Militia were reorganised nationally, with the former becoming the Territorial Force and the latter the Special Reserve; the regiment now had two Reserve and four Territorial battalions.

First World War

Regular Army
The 1st Battalion landed at Le Havre as part of the 19th Brigade, which was an independent command at that time, in August 1914 for service on the Western Front. The battalion famously refused to play football or otherwise fraternise with the enemy on Christmas Day 1914. The 2nd Battalion landed in France as part of the 23rd Brigade in the 8th Division in November 1914 for service on the Western Front.

Territorial Force
The 1/5th Battalion was one of the first Territorial Force units selected to reinforce the Regulars of the British Expeditionary Force (BEF) in France. It landed at Le Havre on 5 November 1914, joining 19th Brigade on 19 November. At this time 19th Bde also included 1st Bn Cameronians 19th Brigade was attached to the 6th Division; later it moved to 33rd Division, a 'Kitchener's Army' formation. The 1/6th Battalion landed at Le Havre as part of the 23rd Brigade in the 8th Division in March 1915 for service on the Western Front. It later joined 33rd Division and in 1916 it merged with the 1/5th to form 5th/6th Bn. The 1/7th Battalion and the 1/8th Battalion landed in Gallipoli as part of the 156th Brigade in the 52nd (Lowland) Division in June 1915; after evacuation from Gallipoli in January 1916 the battalions moved to Egypt and served in the Sinai and Palestine Campaign. They sailed to Marseille in April 1918 and served on the Western Front until the end of the war.

New Armies
The 9th (Service) Battalion landed at Boulogne-sur-Mer as part of the 27th Brigade in the 9th (Scottish) Division in May 1915 for service on the Western Front. The 10th (Service) Battalion landed at Boulogne-sur-Mer as part of the 46th Brigade in the 15th (Scottish) Division in July 1915 for service on the Western Front. The 11th (Service) Battalion landed at Boulogne-sur-Mer as part of the 77th Brigade in the 26th Division in September 1915 for service on the Western Front but sailed for Salonika in November 1915.

Inter-war
The 1st Battalion was deployed to Ireland in 1919 during the Irish War of Independence and then went to India in 1931 while the 2nd Battalion was deployed to Mesopotamia in 1919 and then went to India in 1922.

Second World War

The 1st Battalion, which had been in India at the start of the war and was initially commanded by Lieutenant Colonel Alexander Galloway, was deployed to Burma as part of the 1st Burma Brigade in the 39th Indian Division in 1942 and saw action in the Burma Campaign.

The 2nd Battalion, initially commanded by Lieutenant Colonel Douglas Graham, was deployed to France as part of the 13th Infantry Brigade in the 5th Division within the British Expeditionary Force (BEF) in September 1939 and, after taking part in the Dunkirk evacuation in June 1940, saw action in the Allied invasion of Sicily in July 1943 and the Allied invasion of Italy in September 1943 and, after fighting in the Italian Campaign, serving in both the Moro River and Anzio campaigns until July 1944, took part in the North West Europe Campaign in early 1945, ending in May.

The 6th and 7th Battalions, both Territorial Army battalions, were deployed to France as part of the 156th Infantry Brigade in the 52nd (Lowland) Infantry Division to provide cover for the withdrawal of troops of the British Expeditionary Force; after the Normandy landings in June 1944, the battalion took part in the North West Europe Campaign in late 1944 and in 1945.

The 9th Battalion took part in the Normandy landings as part of the 46th (Highland) Infantry Brigade in the 15th (Scottish) Infantry Division in June 1944 and saw action in the North West Europe Campaign in late 1944 (including action at the Battle of Broekhuizen)  and in 1945.

Post-war
In 1948, along with every other infantry regiment of the British Army, the Cameronians regiment was reduced to a single regular battalion. The 1st Battalion which had been repeatedly decimated in the Burma campaign was placed in suspended animation and the 2nd Battalion was renamed the 1st Battalion while at Gibraltar. It was deployed to Malaya in 1950 during the Malayan Emergency. Under the reforms of the army in the 1967 Defence White Paper, which saw several regiments amalgamated, the Cameronians chose to disband rather than amalgamate with another in the Lowland Brigade.

In the 1960s the unruly behaviour of some of the Cameronians who were stationed in Minden as part of the BAOR caused a local to describe the smaller Scottish soldiers as "poison dwarfs".

The 1st Battalion, The Cameronians was disbanded on 14 May 1968 at Douglas Castle, near Douglas, South Lanarkshire in the presence of the Duke of Hamilton, the Earl of Angus. Its recruiting area in Lanarkshire and Dumfries and Galloway was taken over by the King's Own Scottish Borderers and the Regimental Headquarters finally closed down in 1987.

Regimental museum
The Cameronians Museum is located within the Low Parks Museum, Hamilton, South Lanarkshire.

Traditions
Every new member of the regiment was issued a Bible, as a nod to Richard Cameron, after whom the original 26th Foot was named and the regiment mounted an armed guard at the doors of the Kirk during religious services. Soldiers wore a rifle green doublet with Douglas tartan trews as part of their full dress and No.1 dress uniforms. The regiment was one of only two in Britain to retain the shako as its full-dress headwear after 1878.

Battle honours
The regiment's battle honours included:
Early wars: Blenheim, Ramillies, Oudenarde, Malplaquet, South Africa 1846–72, South Africa 1877-8-92, Relief of Ladysmith, South Africa 1899-1902
The Great War: Mons, Le Cateau, Retreat from Mons, Marne 1914 '18, Aisne 1914, La Bassée 1914, Messines 1914, Armentières 1914, Neuve Chapelle, Aubers, Loos, Somme 1916 '18, Albert 1916, Bazentin, Pozières, Flers-Courcelette, Le Transloy, Ancre Heights, Arras 1917 '18, Scarpe 1917 '18, Arleux, Ypres 1917 '18, Pilckem, Langemarck 1917, Menin Road, Polygon Wood, Passchendaele, St Quentin, Rosières, Avre, Lys, Hazebrouck, Bailleul, Kemmel, Scherpenberg, Soissonnais-Ourcq, Drocourt-Quéant, Hindenberg Line, Épéhy, Canal du Nord, St Quentin Canal, Cambrai 1918, Courtrai, Selle, Sambre, France and Flanders 1914-18, Doiran 1917 '18, Macedonia 1915-18, Gallipoli 1915-16, Rumani, Egypt 1916-17, Gaza, El Mughar, Nebi Samwil, Jaffa, Palestine 1917-18
Second World War: Ypres-Comines Canal, Odon, Cheux, Caen, Mont Pincon, Estry, Nederrijn, Best, Scheldt, South Beveland, Walcheren Causeway, Asten, Roer, Rhineland, Reichswald, Moyland, Rhine, Dreierwalde, Bremen, Artlenberg, North-West Europe 1940, '44-45, Landing in Sicily, Simeto Bridgehead, Sicily 1943, Garigliano Crossing, Anzio, Advance to Tiber, Italy 1943-44, Pegu 1942, Paungde, Yenagyaung 1942, Chindits 1944, Burma 1942 '44

Colonel-in-Chief
The colonel-in-chief from 1956 was HM King Gustaf VI Adolf.

Regimental Colonels
Regimental colonels were:
1881–1899 (1st Battalion): Gen. George Henry Mackinnon, CB (ex 26th Foot)
1881–1882 (2nd Battalion): Gen. William Hassall Eden (ex 90th Foot)
1882–1889 (2nd Battalion): Gen. John Alfred Street
1899–1910: Lt-Gen. Sir James Clerk Rattray, KCB
1910–1918: Maj-Gen. Joseph Henry Laye, CB, CVO
1918–1927: Maj-Gen. Sir Philip Rynd Robertson, KCB, CMG
1927–1946: Maj-Gen. Sir Eric Stanley Girdwood, KBE, CB, CMG
1946–1951: Gen. Sir Thomas Sheridan Riddell-Webster, GCB, DSO
1951–1954: Gen. Sir Richard Nugent O'Connor, GCB, DSO, MC 
1954–1958: Maj-Gen. Douglas Alexander Henry Graham, CB, CBE, DSO, MC
1958–1964: Gen. Sir Horatius Murray, GCB, KBE, DSO
1964–1969: Lt-Gen. Sir Richard George Collingwood, KBE, CB, DSO
1968: Regular unit disbanded
1969–1970: Maj-Gen. Henry Templer Alexander, CB, CBE, DSO
1970–1974: Maj-Gen. Henry Templer Alexander, CB, CBE, DSO (Representative Colonel)
1974–1987: Brig. David Balfour Riddell-Webster, OBE (Representative Colonel)

Affiliations
Affiliations included:
  The Perth Regiment – 1965: Canada
  26th Battalion (The Logan and Albert Regiment) 1928 – 1951: Australia
  The Otago and Southland Regiment 1948 – 1968: New Zealand
  The Witwatersrand Rifles 1937 – 1961: South Africa
  2nd Battalion, Ghana Regiment: Ghana
  7th Duke of Edinburgh's Own Gurkha Rifles 1951– 1968: United Kingdom

Notable former members of the regiment
 See also :Category:Cameronians officers and :Category:Cameronians soldiers
 Brigadier Cyril Nelson Barclay 
 General Sir Roy Bucher
 General Sir Horatius Murray
 General Richard O'Connor
 General Sir Thomas Riddell-Webster
 Lieutenant-General Sir George Collingwood
 Lieutenant-General Sir John Fullerton Evetts
 Lieutenant-General Sir Alexander Galloway
 Major-General Henry Templer Alexander
 Major-General George Carter-Campbell
 Major-General John Dutton Frost
 Major-General Douglas Graham
 Major-General James Haugh
 Major-General Robin Money
 Major-General Sir Philip Rynd Robertson
 Major-General Eric Sixsmith
 Brigadier-General Graham Chaplin
 Rifleman Khan, awarded the Dickin Medal.

Also His Majesty Sultan Qaboos, the former ruler of the Sultantate of Oman, served with the Cameronians as a junior officer.

Memorials
Face 5 of the British memorial on Spion Kop lists the names of the soldiers from the Cameronians who died at the Battle of Spion Kop during the Second Boer War. The Cameronians War Memorial in Kelvingrove Park, Glasgow by Philip Lindsey Clark, unveiled on 9 August 1924, depicts men of the regiment manning a Lewis gun. A monument commemorating both the founding of the regiment by the Earl of Angus in 1689 and its disbanding in 1968 can be found at Douglas, South Lanarkshire. Also within the village is a statue of the Earl of Angus to commemorate the bicentenary of the raising of the regiment.

Footnotes

References

Sources
 Maj A.F. Becke,History of the Great War: Order of Battle of Divisions, Part 1: The Regular British Divisions, London: HM Stationery Office, 1934/Uckfield: Naval & Military Press, 2007, .
 Maj A.F. Becke,History of the Great War: Order of Battle of Divisions, Part 2a: The Territorial Force Mounted Divisions and the 1st-Line Territorial Force Divisions (42–56), London: HM Stationery Office, 1935/Uckfield: Naval & Military Press, 2007, .
 Maj A.F. Becke,History of the Great War: Order of Battle of Divisions, Part 3b: New Army Divisions (30–41) and 63rd (R.N.) Division, London: HM Stationery Office, 1939/Uckfield: Naval & Military Press, 2007, .
 Brig-Gen Sir James E. Edmonds, History of the Great War: Military Operations, France and Belgium, 1914, Vol II, London: Macmillan, 1925/Imperial War Museum & Battery Press, 1995, .

 Lt-Col Graham Seton-Hutchinson, The Thirty-Third Division in France and Flanders, 1915–1919, London: Waterlow & Sons 1921/Uckfield: Naval & Military Press, 2004, .
 Lt-Col R.R. Thompson, The Fifty-Second (Lowland) Division 1914–1918, Glasgow: Maclehose, Jackson 1923/Uckfield: Naval & Military, 2004, .

External links

 The Cameronians
 

 
Cameronians
Scottish regiments
Rifle regiments
Rifle regiments of the British Army
Military units and formations established in 1881

Regiments of the British Army in World War II
Regiments of the British Army in World War I
Military units and formations disestablished in 1968
1881 establishments in the United Kingdom
Military units and formations in Lanarkshire
R